Cypress is an unincorporated community in Jackson County, Florida, United States. It is located near the intersection of U.S. Route 90 and County Road 275, west of Grand Ridge.

Geography

References

Unincorporated communities in Jackson County, Florida
Unincorporated communities in Florida
Former municipalities in Florida